δ Octantis, Latinised as Delta Octantis, has the distinction of being Saturn's southern pole star. An orange giant of class K2III, it has 1.2 times the mass of the Sun and about 25 times the Sun's radius. This star is about 4.3 billion years old, which is similar to the age of the Sun.

Naming

References

Octans
Octantis, Delta
CD-83 189
070638
5339
124882
Southern pole stars

K-type giants
Saturn